Tafel is a surname, and may refer to:

Albert Tafel (1876–1935) German geographer, doctor and explorer
Edgar Tafel (1912–2011), American architect
Gustav Tafel (1830–1909), German-born colonel in the Union Army 
Julius Tafel (1862–1918), German chemist
Tristan Tafel (born 1990), Canadian freestyle skier

Tafel may also refer to:
 Tafel, a Namibian beer.
 Tafel equation for electrochemical reaction rates
 De Stenen Tafel, restaurants in the Netherlands
 Die Tafel / Die Tafeln (plural) is the name of a food bank/network of food banks in Germany. :de:Tafel (Organisation)